Mundari Bani (Mundari: 𞓧𞓟𞓨𞓜𞓕𞓣𞓚 𞓗𞓕𞓨𞓚 Mundari Bani 'Mundari alphabet', also known as Mundari Bani Hisir Hisir 'writing', Nag Mundari 𞓨𞓕𞓦 𞓧𞓟𞓨𞓜𞓕𞓣𞓚, or the Mundari alphabet) is the writing system created for the Mundari language, spoken in eastern India. Mundari is an Austroasiatic language. Mundari Bani has 27 letters and five diacritics, the forms of which are intended to evoke natural shapes. The script is written from left to right.

Community elder and author Rohidas Singh Nag invented and published in late 1980 the alphabetic writing system Mundari Bani, which has seen limited but increasing use in literature, education, and computing.

History
Rohidas Singh Nag started designing the initial characters of Mundari bani in 1949 while in grade school, which he wrote on the walls using clay. By 1953 he had finished a set of 35 characters. He further simplified the alphabet in 1980 by reducing it to 27 alphabetical characters. In 2008 Bharat Munda Samaj, Mundari Samaj Sanwar Jamda and Nag reformed the script in styling and adding glyphs. Since then, fonts were developed using this standard.

Nag presented the alphabet in the 1980s to then-Chief Minister of Odisha Janaki Ballabh Patnaik and submitted a memorandum to recognize the Munda language constitutionally. Nag along with others submitted a memorandum to the then president of India in 1999 appealing again for the constitutional recognition. "Mundari Samaj Sanwar Jamda", a social organisation of the Munda community based in Poda Astia, Mayurbhanj has been demanding to incorporate the Munda language in the Eighth Schedule to the Constitution of India, to air Munda language through All India Radio, and establish a Munda language department at North Odisha University for higher studies on the basis of the writing system and literature. The writing system has seen limited but increasing use in literature, education, and computing.

The script
Since the 2008 edits, Mundari Bani has 27 alphabetical characters, five diacritics, ten (decimal) digits. Their names follow traditional names. It uses Latin-script punctuation like period and comma.

Sample Text
The following text is Article 1 of the Universal Declaration of Human Rights, written in Mundari Bani (a suitable Unicode font may be required for proper viewing):

𞓝𞓐𞓨𞓐𞓗-𞓱:
𞓛𞓐𞓗𞓤𞓨 𞓞𞓐𞓪𞓐 𞓢𞓐𞓢𞓤𞓮 𞓧𞓕𞓨𞓕𞓣𞓔 𞓐𞓜𞓐𞓙 𞓐𞓢𞓝𞓚𞓓𞓕𞓣 𞓢𞓐𞓣𞓤𞓓𞓕𞓦 𞓑𞓕𞓚𞓝𞓚 𞓗𞓕𞓗𞓐𞓝 𞓣𞓤 𞓖𞓐𞓨𞓐𞓧 𞓖𞓐𞓣𞓐𞓔𞓤𞓝𞓤 𞓕𞓡𞓕𞓨𞓕𞓡 𞓐𞓜𞓐𞓦 𞓗𞓐𞓣𞓕𞓗𞓐𞓣𞓚 𞓨𞓕𞓧𞓕𞓢𞓕𞓨𞓕. 𞓚𞓨𞓢𞓟𞓦𞓢𞓤 𞓛𞓤𞓥𞓕 𞓐𞓜𞓐𞓦 𞓖𞓚𞓮𞓭 𞓑𞓤𞓪𞓤𞓦 𞓖𞓚𞓭𞓟𞓣𞓤𞓓𞓕𞓙 𞓤𞓨𞓤𞓧𞓢𞓐 𞓨𞓕𞓧𞓕𞓢𞓕𞓨𞓕 𞓐𞓜𞓐𞓙 𞓚𞓨𞓢𞓟𞓙 𞓒𞓐𞓙𞓝𞓤 𞓞𞓕𞓦𞓤𞓓𞓕 𞓗𞓐𞓓𞓕 𞓒𞓤𞓢𞓕 𞓖𞓕𞓦𞓕𞓣 𞓗𞓕𞓢𞓕𞓝𞓚𞓘𞓕𞓙.

Unicode

The Mundari Bani alphabet was added to the Unicode Standard in September, 2022 with the release of version .
The Unicode block is called Nag Mundari (U+1E4D0–U+1E4FF):

References

Alphabets
Munda scripts
Constructed scripts